Brittan is a surname. Notable people with the surname include:

Colin Brittan (b. 1927), English footballer
Harold Brittan (1894–1964), English-American football (soccer) player
Harriet G. Brittan (1822–1897), British-born American missionary
Leon Brittan (1939-2015), British baron Brittan of Spennithorne, barrister, and politician
Martin Ralph Brittan (1922-2008), American ichthyologist
Samuel Brittan (1933-2020), British newspaper columnist and author
Suzan Brittan (contemporary), American actress and singer
Brittan Hernandez (2009-...)[Horse trainer]

See also
 Britten (disambiguation)
 Brittain (disambiguation)

 *Brittan Hernandez (2009-...)[Horse trainer]